The Irish League of Credit Unions (ILCU) (Irish: Conradh na hÉireann de Chomhair Chreidmheasa) is a trade association for credit unions in Ireland. It operates in both the Republic of Ireland and Northern Ireland. It is an unincorporated body governed by a board of directors elected by member credit unions.

History

The Credit Union movement in Ireland arose out of the Dublin Central Cooperative Society, which was formed in 1952 with the following office holders: Chairman: Thomas Hogan; Secretary: Seamus McEoin, a civil servant; and Treasurer: Eugene O'Riordan, an engineer and native of Macroom, County Cork. The aims and objectives were to promote industry to create jobs.

In 1954 the chairman, Thomas Hogan, died and in the ensuing officer shuffle Seamus McEoin became chairman. Eugene O'Riordan remained as the treasurer and Nora Herlihy, a National School teacher from Ballydesmond, who had recently joined the society, was elected Secretary.

Eugene O'Riordan set up the Dublin Central Co op investment bank to provide capital for industrial development. A surge of support for the investment bank from America, Britain and the Continent resulted in the secretary becoming fearful of the capacity of the society to handle an investment bank and she proposed that it be discontinued. This was a bitter disappointment for Eugene O'Riordan in particular as it was obvious to him that a chord was struck with the Irish diaspora who wanted to help. He felt that the prospects were enormous, especially after a letter in the Catholic Universe brought astonishing results with strong support internationally.

Nora Herlihy then obtained literature on the credit union movement from an acquaintance in America and proposed the adoption of the credit union model instead of the investment bank model for the purpose of getting capital for industrial development.

With the exception of Eugene O'Riordan, the society decided to establish a Credit Union. The credit union movement thus started, and that was the end for the Dublin central co-operative society and the emergent investment bank. The credit union movement became a great success in its own right although it was felt that there was still a gap in terms of supporting industry, as the credit unions could not be a means of obtaining and dispersing venture capital. 
At that stage Seán Forde, an employee at a Dublin bakery, played an important role in the movement.

The economy of the Republic was depressed, urban poverty and emigration were increasing, and the credit union movement was envisaged as a way to help working-class people manage their finances.

The Irish League of Credit Unions (ILCU) was established in 1960.

Functions
The ILCU represents credit unions in social partnership negotiations and lobbying national governments and European Union bodies. It does marketing and research and development. It provides services for members, including legal advice, secretarial service, human resources, information technology, training, and business services. It also takes responsibility for savings protection and monitoring and supervision of member unions.

Regulation 
Each credit union is an autonomous organisation and manages its own affairs. In the Republic of Ireland, the Central Bank of Ireland has overall responsibility for credit unions, in order to protect members’ funds and maintain the financial stability and well-being of credit unions in general. The League, in response to the consolidation of the sector, has accused the Central Bank of acting beyond its statutory powers and has warned the Central Bank against trying “to scare the public or exaggerate risk for the sake of achieving unarticulated policy objectives." The cost to the State of the proposed rationalisation was expected to be in the region of €250 million.

A separate Registrar of Credit Unions for Northern Ireland regulates ILCU members in that jurisdiction.

References

External links
 Irish League of Credit Unions official site

Cooperative federations
Credit union leagues
Credit unions of Ireland
Credit unions of the United Kingdom